The Malinovka (formerly Вака Vaka or Ваку Vaku) is a river in Primorsky Krai, Russia, a left tributary of the Bolshaya Ussurka.

There are three hydrologic posts on the river near villages Ariadnoye, Rakitnoye and Vedenka.

References

Rivers of Primorsky Krai